Stronger is the second album by Belgian singer Kate Ryan, released in 2004 in Europe and 2005 in the United States.

Stronger includes the hits singles "Only If I", "The Promise You Made", and "Goodbye".

Track listing
"Hurry Up" produced by Martin Hanzén and Jimmy Thörnfeldt; all other songs produced by AJ Duncan and Phil Wilde

Personnel 
Kate Ryan - Vocals, lyricist
Andy Janssens a.k.a. AJ Duncan - Producer, lyricist, conductor, pre-producer, keyboards, synths & protocols programming
Phil Wilde - Producer, lyricist, conductor, keyboards, synths & protocols programming
Martin Hanzén - Producer
Jimmy Thörnfeldt - Producer
Steven Tracey - Lyricist
Niklas Bergwall - Lyricist
Niclas Kings - Lyricist
Jeanette Olsson - Lyricist
Marc Gilson - Lyricist
Wanda Walker Janssens - Lyricist
Jo Lemaire - French translations ("La Promesse")
Mieke Aerts - Backing vocals
Jody Pijper - Backing vocals
Patrick Vinx - Backing vocals
Peter Bauwens - Backing vocals
Eric Melaerts - Guitars
Patrick Hamilton - Acoustic piano & strings arrangement
Peter Bulkens - Mixing
Sander van der Heide - Mastering
Ivo Kljuce - Photography
Bea Brych - Make-up

Certifications

References

Kate Ryan albums
2004 albums